Le Sommeil du monstre is a 1998 Franco-Belgian sci-fi comic book written and drawn by Enki Bilal, published by Les Humanoïdes Associés. It is the first volume of the Tétralogie du Monstre series. Translated into English as The Dormant Beast, it was published together with the following two volumes, 32 décembre and Rendez-vous à Paris, under the title The Beast Trilogy: Chapters 1 & 2.

Plot synopsis

The story takes place in a dystopic portrayal of the year 2023, and centers around Nike Hatzfield, a man with extraordinary memory who uses his skill to recall his violent childhood in Sarajevo under the siege during the 1990s Bosnian War.

Footnotes

References

 Le Sommeil du monstre French publications Bedetheque 

French comics titles
Siege of Sarajevo in comics
Comics by Enki Bilal